Deka Deka Island is a small island off the SE end of Logea Island, in East Channel, Milne Bay Province, Papua New Guinea.

Administration 
The island belonged to Logea South Ward, which belongs to Bwanabwana Rural Local Level Government Area LLG, Samarai-Murua District, which are in Milne Bay Province.

Geography 
The island is part of the Logea group, itself a part of Samarai Islands of the Louisiade Archipelago.

References

Islands of Milne Bay Province
Louisiade Archipelago